Karl Rio Hampton (born 4 August 1968) is a former Australian politician. He was a Labor Party member of the Northern Territory Legislative Assembly from 2006 until 2012, representing the electorate of Stuart. He served as  Minister for Environment, Regional Development, Sport and Recreation, Central Australia and Information, Communications and Technology Policy in the Henderson government.

|}

Hampton was born and raised in Alice Springs. He is of Warlpiri, Afghan, Irish and Scottish descent. He was elected in a 2006 by-election following the resignation of Peter Toyne, and was easily re-elected in 2008. He was widely expected to cruise to re-election in 2012 as well, However, he was defeated by his aunt, Country Liberal Party candidate Bess Price, as part of Labor's collapse in the remote seats at that election.  Hampton saw his primary vote more than halved, and ultimately lost to Price on a two-party swing of 18.6 percent.

References

1968 births
Living people
Indigenous Australian politicians
Members of the Northern Territory Legislative Assembly
Australian Labor Party members of the Northern Territory Legislative Assembly
People from Alice Springs
21st-century Australian politicians
People educated at Immanuel College, Adelaide
Warlpiri people
Australian people of Afghan descent
Australian people of Irish descent
Australian people of Scottish descent